Chikage is a feminine Japanese given name. Notable people with the name include:

, Japanese actress
, Japanese actress and politician
, Japanese speed skater

Japanese feminine given names